() is the Islamic funeral prayer; a part of the Islamic funeral ritual. The prayer is performed in congregation to seek pardon for the deceased and all dead Muslims. The  is a collective obligation upon Muslims i.e., if some Muslims take the responsibility of doing it, the obligation is fulfilled, but if no-one fulfils it, then all Muslims will be accountable.

Performing the funeral prayer when the body is not present is generally not permitted in the Hanafi and Maliki s, is permitted in the Hanbali , and is recommended in the Shafi'i .

Description

It is preferable that those praying divide themselves into odd rows with one person as an imam standing alone in front and while facing the qiblah. The body is placed in front of the Imam. If there is more than one body, then these should be put in front of the other.  The spoken part of the prayer involves quietly reciting sura Al-Fatiha, then praying for God to bestow peace, mercy and blessings on Muhammad, and finally saying two du'as. There is no ruku in Janazah prayer.

Muhammad and his companions explained how the salat should be:

 Having the appropriate neeyat (intention) in your heart, You say the first takbir while raising your hands, then you fold and hold your hands on your chest in the usual manner, the right hand on the left, then you seek refuge with Allah from the accursed Shayṭan, then you utter Bismillah and recite Al-Fatiha (with regard to Hanafis, they only recite the Thana or Sana - an optional du'aa or supplication usually said in all of the 5 daily prayers)
 Then you say Takbir (raising of the hands is optional)  and Durood-i Ibrahimi.
 Then you say the third Takbir (raising of the hands is optional) and make du'a for the deceased.

4. Then a fourth Takbir (again, raising the hands is optional) is recited, followed by a short pause, then a final taslim to the right, saying "Assalaamu ‘Alaykum Warahmatullah" ("Peace and mercy of God be unto you"). Shafi'is and Malikis say 1 salam is obligatory and 2 is optional while Hanafis says you have to give 2 salams and Hanbalis says you have to give 1 salam.

Exceptions 
According to an authentic hadith, Muhammad did not say the burial prayers of a person who committed suicide;

References

External links

 After Death Rituals

Death customs
Salah
Salah terminology